John Herstad (born 8 July 1936) is a Norwegian historian.

He was born in Bergen. Herstad was appointed professor at the University of Bergen from 1980. He served the head of the National Archives of Norway from 1982 to 2006. He was decorated Commander of the Order of St. Olav in 2005.

References

1936 births
Living people
20th-century Norwegian historians
Academic staff of the University of Bergen
Directors-General of the National Archives of Norway
21st-century Norwegian historians